Piletocera violalis is a moth in the family Crambidae. It was described by Julius Lederer in 1863. It is found on Indonesia's Ambon Island.

References

V
Endemic fauna of Indonesia
Moths of Indonesia
Fauna of the Lesser Sunda Islands
Moths described in 1863